The U.S. state of Minnesota is divided into 1,790 townships in 87 counties.

See also
 List of cities in Minnesota
 List of Minnesota counties

External links
 Census 2000 Gazetteer
 Minnesota Association of Townships
 National Association of Towns and Townships

Townships
Townships
Minnesota